DEFICIENS is a gene that regulates floral architecture.

Examples of DEFICIENS genes include:

 Various genes discussed at ABC model of flower development§DEFICIENS
 Antirrhinum majus DEFICIENS
 Elaeis guineensis DEFICIENS

Plant genes